Canovee GAA is a Gaelic football club based in the villages of Canovee, Aherla and Carrigadrohid in County Cork, Ireland. The club is a member of Cork GAA and Muskerry divisional board. The club does not field hurling teams, but Cloughduv nearby provides opportunities for players who wish to hurl.

Achievements
 All-Ireland Junior Club Football Championship Winners (1) 2008
 Munster Junior Club Football Championship Winners (1) 2007
 Cork Intermediate Football Championship Winners (1) 1973
 Cork Junior Football Championship Winners (3) 1950, 1968, 2007  Runners-Up 1948
 Cork Minor Football Championship Runners-Up 1952
 Cork Under-21 B Football Championship Winner (1) 2013
 Mid Cork Junior A Football Championship Winners (16) 1939, 1943, 1946, 1947, 1948, 1949, 1950, 1955, 1957, 1961, 1962, 1968, 1979, 1982, 1999, 2007

Notable players
 Dan O'Sullivan - captain of Cork Junior Football team 1950, and winner of All-Ireland Junior Football Championship medal 1955
 J.J. Hinchion
 Noel Dunne
 Connie Kelly

References

External links
 Canovee GAA website
 Cork GAA records

Gaelic football clubs in County Cork
Gaelic games clubs in County Cork